Murderaz (also Romanized as Mūrderāz; also known as Mūrdāz-e Bozorg and Mūrderāz-e Bālā) is a village in Khafri Rural District, in the Central District of Sepidan County, Fars Province, Iran. At the 2006 census, its population was 32, in 9 families.

References 

Populated places in Sepidan County